Bathgate Upper railway station was a railway station serving the town of Bathgate in West Lothian, Scotland. It was located on the Bathgate and Coatbridge Railway.

History 

Bathgate was opened by the Edinburgh and Bathgate Railway on 12 November 1849, being renamed Bathgate Upper on 1 August 1865 by the North British Railway at the same time as the Monkland Railways station of the same name was renamed Bathgate Lower.

The station lay on a curve immediately next to Bathgate West Junction, approximately 300 yards north west of the western end of the current station. A loop line existed behind the down platform, and from this line a branch ran to Mosside and Riddochhill collieries. Continuing through the station, a line branched off to the right to the Bathgate branch of the Monkland Railways. (This was known as the Blackston Branch in North British documentation). Slightly further west was a triangular junction. The line passed Boghead Colliery. 28 chains (slightly over a quarter of a mile) from Upper Station lay Polkemmet Junction. From here, the line continued west as the Bathgate and Coatbridge Railway, while the Wilsontown, Morningside and Coltness Railway headed due south.

The station was closed on 9 January 1956.

The railway route through the station was re-opened in 2011 as part of the Airdrie–Bathgate rail link, but the station itself has not been re-opened.

Services

References

Notes

Sources 
 
 
 
 Airdrie-Bathgate Rail Link

External links
 RAILSCOT on Edinburgh and Bathgate Railway
 RAILSCOT on Bathgate and Coatbridge Railway
 RAILSCOT on Wilsontown, Morningside and Coltness Railway 

Disused railway stations in West Lothian
Former North British Railway stations
Railway stations in Great Britain opened in 1849
Railway stations in Great Britain closed in 1956
1849 establishments in Scotland
Bathgate